In demonology, Ipos is an Earl and powerful Prince of Hell (a Duke to some authors) who has thirty-six legions of demons under his command. He knows and can reveal all things, past, present and future (only the future to some authors, and past and future to others). He can make men witty and valiant.

He is commonly depicted with the body of an angel with the head of a lion, the tail of a hare, and the feet of a goose, less frequently in the same shape but with the body of a lion, and rarely as a vulture.

Other spellings: Aiperos, Ayperos, Ayporos, Ipes.

See also

The Lesser Key of Solomon

Sources
S. L. MacGregor Mathers, A. Crowley, The Goetia: The Lesser Key of Solomon the King (1904). 1995 reprint: .

Goetic demons